"Wild" (stylised in all caps) is a song by Australian singer and songwriter Troye Sivan from his fourth extended play (EP), Wild (2015). It was written by Sivan and Alex Hope, and a revised version features a contribution from Alessia Cara. The song was released on 3 September 2015 and promoted as its lead single. It is also featured on Sivan's debut studio album, Blue Neighbourhood (2015).

Music video
The song's accompanying music video was directed by Tim Mattia and released as part of Sivan's "Blue Neighbourhood" music video trilogy. The trilogy made up of "Wild", "Fools" and "Talk Me Down" was filmed in the Sydney suburb of Kurnell, New South Wales.

Chart performance
The song reached number 16 on the ARIA Charts, becoming his second top 20 single and peaking within the top 40 in New Zealand.

Charts

Certifications

Release history

Alessia Cara re-release

A new version of the song was re-released on 23 June 2016, featuring a new verse from Canadian singer and songwriter Alessia Cara. On 28 June 2016, it impacted top 40 radio stations in the United States as the fourth single from his debut studio album Blue Neighbourhood.

Background
The concept came about after Sivan met Cara at several music events. He had covered Cara's hit single "Here" for a live radio show and she responded with a cover of his track "Youth". In phone text conversations, the two performers joked about which song was next. Cara told Sivan her favourite song of his was "Wild" and shortly afterwards wrote and recorded a verse in a European studio. When she sent it to Sivan, he says his response was: "This is so good, we have to put it out."

Music videos
On 22 July 2016, a new video for the single was released on Sivan's Vevo and YouTube channel. The video features both singers and was directed by Malia James and produced by Taylor Vandegrift and Danny Lockwood. It was filmed in Toronto, Canada, near Cara's home.

Chart performance
The re-released new version reached number 26 in its own right on the Australian ARIA Charts.

Track listing

Charts

Radio and release history

References

2015 singles
2015 songs
Alessia Cara songs
EMI Records singles
Music videos shot in Sydney
Music videos shot in Toronto
Songs written by Alex Hope (songwriter)
Songs written by Troye Sivan
Troye Sivan songs